Dio may refer to:

Given name 
Dio or Dion, masculine given name
 Dio of Alexandria, Greek philosopher and ambassador (1st century BC)
 Dio Chrysostom, Roman philosopher (AD 40–120)
 Cassius Dio, Roman historian (AD 160–230)
 Cassius Dio (consul 291)
 Dio Lequaglie (born 1963), Italian beach volleyball player

Surname
 Ronnie James Dio (1942–2010), American heavy metal singer
 Johnny Dio (1914–1979), Italian American mobster

Places 
 Dio, Burkina Faso
 Diö, a small village in southern Sweden
 Dio-et-Valquières, France
 Dio-Gare, Mali
 Diu, India, formerly known as Dio

Music 
 Dio (band), an American heavy metal band
 Dio - Distraught Overlord, a Japanese heavy metal band
 "Dio" (song), a song by Tenacious D on the 2001 eponymous album
 Dio (album), an album by Jørn Lande
 "Dio", a song from the Throwing Muses album Red Heaven

Abbreviations 
Days Inventory Outstanding
Diocesan Boys' School, Hong Kong
Diocesan Girls' School, Hong Kong
St. John's Diocesan Girls' Higher Secondary School, India
Diocesan School for Girls (Auckland), New Zealand
Defence Intelligence Organisation, Australian military intelligence agency
Defense Industries Organization, conglomerate of companies run by the Islamic Republic of Iran
Defence Infrastructure Organisation, an operating arm of the UK Ministry of Defence
Diet-induced obesity model (DIO model), an animal model used in laboratory research
Digital Input/Output

Other uses 
 the Italian word for God
 Dio Brando, a fictional character and the main antagonist from the manga and anime series JoJo's Bizarre Adventure known simply as DIO
 Honda Dio, motorscooter produced in India
 Radio Dio, an independent radio station, broadcasting to the French city of Saint-Etienne
 Dio Eraclea, character from the anime Last Exile as well as its sequel Last Exile: Fam, The Silver Wing

See also 
Dion (disambiguation)
Dios (disambiguation)
D10 (disambiguation)
Diou (disambiguation)
Deo (disambiguation)